Aillon-le-Vieux (Arpitan: Alyon-le-Viely) is a commune in the Savoie department in the Auvergne-Rhône-Alpes region in Southeastern France. In 2019, it had a population of 182.

Demographics

See also
Communes of the Savoie department

References

Communes of Savoie